Lion is a 2016 Australian biographical drama film directed by Garth Davis (in his feature directorial debut) from a screenplay by Luke Davies based on the 2013 non-fiction book A Long Way Home by Saroo Brierley. The film stars Dev Patel, Sunny Pawar, Rooney Mara, David Wenham, and Nicole Kidman, as well as Abhishek Bharate, Divian Ladwa, Priyanka Bose, Deepti Naval, Tannishtha Chatterjee, and Nawazuddin Siddiqui. It tells the true story of how Brierley, 25 years after being separated from his family in India, sets out to find them. It is a joint production between Australia and the United Kingdom.

The film, which had its world premiere at the Toronto International Film Festival on 10 September 2016, was given a limited release in North America on 25 November 2016, by The Weinstein Company before opening generally on 6 January 2017. It was released in Australia on 19 January 2017 and in the United Kingdom on 20 January 2017.

Lion was well-received by critics, with praise for the acting (particularly from Patel and Kidman), emotional weight, visuals, cinematography and screenplay; it received six Oscar nominations at the 89th Academy Awards, including Best Picture, Best Supporting Actor (Patel), Best Supporting Actress (Kidman), and Best Adapted Screenplay. It won two BAFTA Awards for Best Supporting Actor (Patel) and Best Adapted Screenplay. The film was also commercially successful, making $140 million worldwide, becoming one of the highest-grossing Australian films of all time.

Plot 
In 1986, five-year-old Saroo lives with his elder brother Guddu, his mother, and his baby sister in Khandwa, India. Guddu and Saroo steal coal from freight trains to trade for milk and food. Saroo accompanies Guddu to work overnight, and they arrive at a nearby train station, where Saroo falls asleep on a bench and is unable to find Guddu upon waking up. He searches for him on an empty train, only to fall asleep in one of the compartments and awake sometime later to find the train in motion and the doors locked. After several days the train arrives in faraway Calcutta where Saroo does not understand the local Bengali language. He tries to obtain a ticket home, but the attendant does not recognise the name of his village, which Saroo says is "Ganestalay". He spends the night in the station with some street children, but is forced to flee when a group of men try to kidnap them.

Saroo continues to wander around the city before meeting Noor, a seemingly friendly woman who takes him back to her apartment and tells him that a man named Rama will help him find his way home. Saroo escapes, sensing that Noor and Rama have sinister intentions, and evades Noor when she chases after him. After two months of living near the Howrah Bridge, Saroo is taken to the police and placed into an orphanage when authorities are unable to trace his family.

An advertisement about Saroo is placed in several local newspapers, but no one responds, though an Australian couple has become interested in adopting him. Saroo is taught basic English and moves to Hobart, Tasmania in 1987, under the care of Sue and John Brierley, where he slowly starts to settle into his new lifestyle. A year later, they adopt another boy, Mantosh, who has trouble adjusting to his new home and suffers from rage and self-harm.

Twenty years later, Saroo, now a young man, moves to Melbourne to study hotel management and starts a relationship with American student Lucy. During a meal with some Indian friends at their home, Saroo remembers that he is not from Calcutta and that he has been lost for more than twenty years. He reveals this to his friends, who suggest he use Google Earth to search for his hometown. Saroo commences his search, but over time disconnects from Lucy and his adoptive family, overwhelmed by the thought of what his biological family must feel while he has been missing.

Saroo visits his adoptive mother, whose health is deteriorating, and learns that she is not infertile, but chose to help children in need through adoption. One evening, while continuing his search, he recognises the rock formations where his mother worked and finds the area where he lived: the Ganesh Talai neighbourhood of the Khandwa district. He finally tells his adoptive mother about his search and she fully supports his efforts.

Saroo returns to his hometown and, with the help of a local English speaker, has an emotional reunion with his biological mother and sister. He also learns that Guddu was hit and killed by an oncoming train the night they were separated. Saroo's mother never moved away from the village, as she never gave up hope that her missing son would one day return. The film ends with captions about the real Saroo's return to India in February 2012. Photos of the real Australian family are shown, as well as footage of Saroo introducing Sue to his biological mother, who deeply appreciates Sue's care for her son. Saroo later learned that he had spent years mispronouncing his own name, which was actually Sheru, meaning "lion".

Cast 
 Dev Patel as Saroo Brierley
 Sunny Pawar as Young Saroo Brierley
 Rooney Mara as Lucy, Saroo's girlfriend
 David Wenham as John Brierley, Saroo's adoptive father
 Nicole Kidman as Sue Brierley, Saroo's adoptive mother
 Abhishek Bharate as Guddu Khan, Saroo's biological brother
 Divian Ladwa as Mantosh Brierley, Saroo's adoptive brother
 Keshav Jadhav as Young Mantosh 
 Priyanka Bose as Kamla Munshi, Saroo's biological mother
 Deepti Naval as Saroj Sood, founder of the Indian Society for Sponsorship and Adoption (ISSA)
 Tannishtha Chatterjee as Noor
 Nawazuddin Siddiqui as Rama
 Benjamin Rigby as Waiter
 Menik Gooneratne as Swarmina
 Riddhi Sen as Café Man, responsible for bringing Saroo to the authorities
 Kaushik Sen as Police Officer
 Rita Boy as Amita, Saroo's friend at the orphanage
 Pallavi Sharda as Prama, Saroo's college friend
 Sachin Joab as Bharat, Saroo's college friend
 Arka Das as Sami, Saroo's college friend
 Emilie Cocquerel as Annika, Saroo's college friend
 Todd Sampson as a professor

Production 

This Australian film is based on Saroo Brierley's memoir A Long Way Home.

While writing the screenplay, Luke Davies acknowledged the challenges of adapting a book that is primarily about an online search:

"It was finding the right balance of the big cinema "no-no", which is that screens on screens is not good. Yet we felt very strongly that our situation was quite different from the usual procedural crime drama TV model, where there are a whole bunch of actors that are crammed with exposition-heavy dialogue pointing at computer screens. We felt that we were a million miles away from that. The relationship with the technology was instigated by a purely and deeply emotional drive and desire to make it to the end of the myth – to find wholeness with the reunification with the lost mother and to find out who you are."

In October 2014, Dev Patel and Nicole Kidman were cast in the film for the lead roles, although they were nominated in supporting categories. In January 2015, Nawazuddin Siddiqui, Priyanka Bose, Tannishtha Chatterjee, and Deepti Naval joined the cast. In April 2015, Rooney Mara, David Wenham, and Divian Ladwa also joined the cast. Pallavi Sharda also joined the film's cast to play Saroo's friend. Hauschka and Dustin O'Halloran composed the film's score.

Filming 
Principal photography on the film began in January 2015 in Kolkata, India. In mid-April, filming moved to Australia, in Melbourne and then to several locations in Tasmania, including Hobart. Kidman filmed her scenes in Australia.

Music

Dustin O'Halloran and Hauschka teamed up to write the score. Sia wrote the song "Never Give Up" especially for the film. Also included in the film are the songs "The Sun, The Sand And The Sea" from songwriter Jimmy Radcliffe and "Urvasi Urvasi" by A R Rahman. The film includes other songs from artists such as Hercules and Love Affair ("Blind"), Mondo Rock ("State of the Heart"), Enigma ("The Rivers of Belief") and Picturetone Pete and Jimmy Radcliffe ("The Sun the Sand and the Sea"). The ‘Disco King’ legendary Bappi Lahiri's iconic track ‘Come Closer’ from the movie Kasam Paida Karne Wale Ki has been picturised on Dev Patel in Australia.

Release 
The film had its world premiere at the Toronto International Film Festival on 10 September 2016. It served as the opening night film at the Zurich Film Festival on 22 September 2016. It also screened at the London Film Festival on 12 October 2016, and at the Hamptons International Film Festival on 7 and 8 October 2016. The film was released in the United States on 25 November 2016, in Australia on 19 January 2017, and in the United Kingdom on 20 January 2017. A special red carpet charity event for the Tasmanian premiere of Lion was attended by the film's subject, Saroo Brierley and his family at the State Cinema in December 2016.

Lion was made available on Digital HD on 28 March 2017, and was then followed by a release on Blu-ray and DVD on 11 April 2017. The film debuted at No. 10 on the Top 20 NPD VideoScan chart.

Reception

Box office
Lion grossed $51 million in the United States and Canada and $88.3 million in other countries for a worldwide total of $140.1 million, against a production budget of $12 million.

In its limited opening weekend in the United States and Canada, the film made $123,360 from four theatres (an average of $30,840, the highest of the weekend). On the weekend of 17–19 March 2017, Lion crossed the $50 million mark at the North American box-office, becoming the fifth 2016 film among the Academy Award for Best Picture nominees to surpass this threshold.

In Australia, it opened at number one with $3.18 million, the biggest opening ever for an Australian indie film, and the fifth biggest debut for an Australian film overall. It grossed $29.6 million, becoming the fifth highest-grossing Australian film ever at the Australian box office.

Critical response
Lion received generally positive reviews, with the performances of Patel and Kidman being praised. On review aggregation website Rotten Tomatoes, it has an approval rating of 84%, based on 270 reviews, with a weighted average rating of 7.30/10. The critical consensus reads: "Lions undeniably uplifting story and talented cast make it a moving journey that transcends the typical cliches of its genre." On Metacritic the film has a normalised score of 69 out of 100, based on 45 critics, indicating "generally favorable reviews". PostTrak reported that 92% of audience members gave the film a rating of either "excellent" or "very good".

Brian Truitt of USA Today wrote: "The finale is manipulative in every way, squeezing out the emotions of the audience. But Lion's well-plotted narrative and thoughtful characters suck you in so much that the journey there is totally worth it." Novelist and critic Salman Rushdie thought highly of the film stating that while he often lacked interest in films nominated for an Oscar, this year he rooted for Lion, believing that "I would like it to win in every category it's nominated for and in most of the categories it isn't nominated for as well." Noting that he wept "unstoppably" while viewing the film, Rushdie said that he is "frequently suspicious of Western films set in contemporary India, and so one of the things that most impressed me about Lion was the authenticity and truth and unsparing realism of its Indian first half. Every moment of the little boy's journey rings true – not an instant of exoticism – and as a result his plight touches us all. Greig Fraser's cinematography portrays the beauty of the country, both honestly and exquisitely [...] Dev Patel and Nicole Kidman, in the film's Australian second half, give wonderful performances too".

Some critics mentioned that parts of the film move along at a slow pace. For example, Anthony Lane of The New Yorker wrote: "... based on a true story; though wrenching, there is barely enough of it to fill the dramatic space, and the second half is a slow and muted affair after the Dickensian punch of the first."

Accolades 

Lion received six Oscar nominations at the 89th Academy Awards, including Best Picture, Best Supporting Actor (Patel), Best Supporting Actress (Kidman) and Best Adapted Screenplay, but did not win in any of the categories. It did, however, win two BAFTA Awards: Best Actor in a Supporting Role (Patel) and Best Adapted Screenplay. At Australia's 7th AACTA Awards, it won all twelve awards that it was nominated for, including Best Film.

See also 
Bashu, the Little Stranger

References

External links

 
 
 
 
 Official screenplay

2016 films
2010s adventure drama films
British adventure drama films
British Indian films
Australian adventure drama films
Indian-Australian films
BAFTA winners (films)
Drama films based on actual events
Films about adoption
Films about brothers
Films shot in India
Films about Google
Films about missing people
Films about orphans
Films based on non-fiction books
Films shot in Tasmania
Films shot in Melbourne
Films shot in Kolkata
Films set in the 20th century
Films set in the 21st century
Films set in 1986
Films set in 1987
Films set in 1988
Films set in 2008
Films set in 2010
Films set in 2012
Films set in Madhya Pradesh
Films set in Kolkata
Films set in Melbourne
Films set in Tasmania
Films whose writer won the Best Adapted Screenplay BAFTA Award
2010s Hindi-language films
Google Earth
The Weinstein Company films
Screen Australia films
See-Saw Films films
2016 directorial debut films
2016 drama films
Films scored by Dustin O'Halloran
2010s English-language films
2016 multilingual films
Australian multilingual films
British multilingual films
2010s British films